Meiacanthus urostigma, the tailspot fangblenny, is a species of combtooth blenny found in the eastern Indian Ocean where it is only known from the Surin Islands.

References

urostigma
Fish described in 2001